Mirko Pigliacelli (born 30 June 1993) is an Italian professional footballer who plays as a goalkeeper for  club Palermo.

Club career 
Pigliacelli is a graduate of the Roma youth academy. In 2012, he moved to fellow Serie A club Parma. For the 2012–13 season, he was loaned to Serie B team Sassuolo, but played only once for I Neroverdi as they were promoted to Serie A. During the 2013–14 season, he had further Serie B loan spells, this time for Pescara and Reggina, playing a combined 24 league games.

In 2014, he joined Serie B newcomers, Frosinone on a season long loan. on 26 January 2015 the deal became definitive.

Pigliacelli then joined Pescara in the summer of 2015 as a free agent, and was immediately loaned to Pro Vercelli for the remainder of the season. On 3 January 2018, he was again loaned to Pro Vercelli.

Universitatea Craiova
On 30 June 2018, he joined Universitatea Craiova on a season long loan.
After becoming one of the most appreciated goalkeepers of the Romanian Liga I, on 18 December 2018, "the white and blues" announced they had extended their contract with Pigliacelli. The goalkeeper signed a new deal until 2022, plus an extension for another year while Universitatea paid Pro Vercelli €300,000 to make the move permanent.

In 2019, according to Tuttomercato he attracted transfer interest from Serie A clubs Torino, Cagliari and Parma.

Return to Italy
On 22 July 2022, Pigliacelli signed a three-year contract with Palermo in Serie B.

Career statistics

Club

Honours

Sassuolo
Serie B: 2012–13

Universitatea Craiova
Cupa României: 2020–21
Supercupa României: 2021

Individual
Liga I Team of the Season: 2018–19, 2020–21

References

External links
 
 AIC profile (data by football.it) 

1993 births
Living people
Footballers from Rome
Italian footballers
Association football goalkeepers
Serie B players
Parma Calcio 1913 players
Frosinone Calcio players
Reggina 1914 players
U.S. Sassuolo Calcio players
Trapani Calcio players
Delfino Pescara 1936 players
F.C. Pro Vercelli 1892 players
Liga I players
CS Universitatea Craiova players
Palermo F.C. players
Italian expatriate footballers
Italian expatriate sportspeople in Romania
Expatriate footballers in Romania